Langley is an unincorporated community in Ellsworth County, Kansas, United States.

History
A post office was opened in Langley in 1887, and remained in operation until it was discontinued in 1953.

Education
The community is served by Smoky Valley USD 400 public school district.

See also
 Kanopolis Lake
 Kanopolis State Park
 Mushroom Rock State Park

References

Further reading

External links
 Ellsworth County maps: Current, Historic, KDOT

Unincorporated communities in Ellsworth County, Kansas
Unincorporated communities in Kansas